SCCM may refer to:

Organizations
 Society of Critical Care Medicine, an organization dedicated to the practice of critical nursing care
 Sichuan Conservatory of Music, a music institution in China
 SCC Mohammédia, a Moroccan football club
 Southwestern College of Christian Ministries, US

Science and technology
 SCCM (flow unit) (standard cubic centimeters per minute), a flow measurement term
 System Center Configuration Manager, the latest version of Microsoft Systems Management Server
 Shock Compression of Condensed Matter, a unit of the American Physical Society

See also
 CHRNA1 or SCCMS, a protein
 Software configuration management (SCM)